Axis of Advance was a Canadian death metal band from Edmonton, active from 1998 to 2008. Their music was described as "freaked-out, hyper and evil metal...not for the weak and not really for most rational human beings, but it will sound great to those looking for a slice of evil black metal the way it should be done."

History
The band began as Sacramentary Abolishment, which was formed in 1993 by guitarist/vocalist Wör (Jason McLeod), bassist/vocalist Vermina, aka Verminaard (Chris Ross) and drummer Paulus Kressman, who came up with the name. In 1997, Kressman left the band to start the solo project Rites of Thy Degringolade. Wör and Vermin recruited drummer James Read and re-named the band Axis of Advance.

On Halloween 1997, Sacramentary Abolishment launched their album The Distracting Stone at Area 51 in Edmonton. Vermin brought a pig’s head onto the stage, ripped into it with a battleaxe, then pitched it into the crowd.

In a 1998 interview with Russian Metal, Vermin revealed that the name Sacramentary Abolishment stood for the abolishment of all religious sacrament, and that he believed that "Black metal is strictly a white man’s realm." In 1999, the trio was banned from performing at a planned show in Edmonton for alleged Nazi leanings and symbolism. In 2002, prior to the released of the band's album The List, they issued a press release denying affiliation with the white supremacist movement.

The band toured Europe in 2004, then traveled to Malmö Sweden, where they recorded their album Obey at Berno Studio.

Axis of Advance dissolved in 2008.

Verminaard plays session guitars in Read's main band Revenge and was involved in Weapon for a short period of time.  Vermin and J. Read both play in Blood Revolt along with Primordial's A.A. Nemtheanga.

Discography

Albums

As Sacramentary Abolishment:
 Misanthropy (Cassette Demo), Independent 1994
 Nebulous (Cassette Demo), Independent 1995
 River of Corticone (CD), Catharsis Records 1996 (re-released by Fifth Division, 2006)
 The Distracting Stone (CD), Catharsis Records 1997

As Axis of Advance:
 Strike (CD/LP), Death to Mankind 2001
 The List (CD/LP), Osmose Productions 2002
 Obey (CD/LP), Osmose Productions

Singles & EPs
 Landline, Catharsis Records 1999
 Purify (mCD/mLP), Osmose Productions 2006

Compilation inclusions
 Awaiting The Glorious Damnation Of Mankind (vinyl 7-inch EP), Demonion Productions 2001
 The World Domination IV: The 10 Years of Osmose Productions (CD), Osmose Productions 2002
 Apokalyptik Warfare Vol. 1 (CD), Osmose Productions 2003 
 Rising of Yog-Sothoth: Tribute to Thergothon (CD), Solitude Records 2009
 Sonic Cathedrals Vol. XXXVIII, 2012
 Death Hammer Vol. 1 digital release 2013
 Cvlt Nation 7th Anniversary Mixtape digital release 2018

References

External links 
Axis of Advance
Osmose Productions
Red Stream
Invictus Productions

1998 establishments in Alberta
2008 disestablishments in Alberta
Musical groups established in 1998
Musical groups disestablished in 2008
Musical groups from Edmonton
Canadian black metal musical groups
Blackened death metal musical groups
Canadian musical trios